Asa L. Baldwin (July 17, 1822 in West Fairlee, Vermont – ?) was a member of the Wisconsin State Assembly during the 1877 session. Other positions he held include postmaster and superintendent of schools. He was a Republican.

References

People from West Fairlee, Vermont
People from Waupaca County, Wisconsin
Wisconsin postmasters
School superintendents in Wisconsin
Republican Party members of the Wisconsin State Assembly
1822 births
Year of death missing